Carr Township may refer to the following townships in the United States:

 Carr Township, Clark County, Indiana
 Carr Township, Jackson County, Indiana
 Carr Township, Durham County, North Carolina